Cao Ying may refer to:

Cao Ying (translator) (草婴, 1923–2015), translator
Cao Ying (sport shooter) (曹英, born 1974), sport shooter
  (曹颖, born 1974), actress